Daniel Broström (1870 in Kristinehamn – 24 July 1925) was the Swedish Naval Minister from 1914 to 1917. He was the son of Axel Broström. He was married to Anna Ida Broström, and had a son, Dan-Axel Broström. Broström died in a car accident near Trönninge, south of Halmstad, on 24 July 1925.

References

External links

20th-century Swedish businesspeople
1870 births
1925 deaths
People from Kristinehamn
Swedish Ministers for Defence
Road incident deaths in Sweden
Swedish businesspeople in shipping